Fathollah Mojtabaei (born December 10, 1927, Tehran) is an Iranian author and historian. He is a permanent member of Academy of Persian Language and Literature and a member of the faculty of the Center for the Great Islamic Encyclopedia.

Early life
Dr. Fathollah Mojtabaei was born on December 10, 1927, in Tehran, Iran. A few months after his birth, his mother took him to Farahan County, Markazi Province, Iran. He stayed in Farahan until he was fourteen. His father and his grandfather were Sufi elders. He received his basic education in such a family, which led him to study the history of religions and philosophy of the East and India later.

Education and career
Until the age of fourteen, he taught basics of literature, formal sciences and French language in Farahan County. In 1941, he came to Arak and entered high school there. After finishing high school, he came to Tehran and continued his education at the University of Tehran. In 1953, he received a bachelor's degree in English Language and Literature from the Faculty of Letters and Humanities of the University of Tehran. From 1953 until 1959, he taught literature and foreign languages in Arak and Tehran high schools. He also began writing and several his poems and stories were published in magazines, he also translated Aristotle's Poetics.

In 1960, he was sent abroad by the Ministry of Culture to get acquainted with new methods of writing textbooks. After a period of study and research in this field in the Columbia University in United States, he returned to Iran and was in charge of preparing and compiling literature textbooks for high schools.

In 1962, he was appointed as Iranian Cultural Counselor in Pakistan and the management of Iranian cultural houses in the city of Lahore. Until 1965 he was engaged in cultural services and research on Islamic-Iranian culture of the subcontinent there. There he learned Sanskrit and studied the history of the Islamic period in India and Persian culture and literature.

In 1966, he went to the United States at the invitation of Professor Wilfred Cantwell Smith, a renowned Islamologist and Hinduologist and director of the Center for the Study of World Religions at Harvard University, where he researched the history of world religions and taught Persian literature and mystical texts in Persian. He also received Masters in Comparative history of Religions from Harvard University. Then he continued his studies in History of Eastern Religions and Philosophy and finally in 1971 received his PhD in this field.

During these years he traveled to India several times to study the traditional methods of interpreting Hindu texts as well as to observe the situation and religious of the Indian Zoroastrians in Varanasi, Delhi and Mumbai.

After completing his studies, he returned to Iran and began to teach in universities. For a while, he taught Persian literature at Damavand College and in philosophy group of Faculty of Letters and Humanities of the University of Tehran, he taught Eastern Philosophy. Then he was transferred to the Faculty of Theology and Islamic Studies of the University of Tehran and served in the Department of Comparative Religions and Mysticism.

In 1974, he was assigned as Iranian Cultural Counselor in India, and until the fall of 1977, he was engaged in services related to the study and research on the intellectual and cultural relations between Muslims and Hindus in the subcontinent, and published several books and articles in this field.

After completing his mission and returning to Iran, he continued to teach at the Faculty of Theology and Islamic Studies of the University of Tehran and was in charge of the management of the Department of Religions and Mysticism for several periods. He also taught history of religions, methodology and comparative mysticism there.

During his cultural services, he has published nearly 200 titles of books, articles, poems and book reviews in the form of authorship, translation and correction in Persian and English in Iran and abroad.

Bibliography

Books
 Chitra and a few lyric poems from the gardener of love (original title in ), in Persian language, Translation, 1955
 New Persian poetry (original title in ), in Persian language, Translation, 1955
 Poetic Art: Poetry (original title in ), in Persian language, Translation, 1958
 The best poems of Robert Frost (original title in ), in Persian language, Translation, 1959
 The Golden Age of Iran and its philosophy and art (original title in ), in Persian language, Translation, 1960
 Persian grammar for the first year of high school (original title in ), in Persian language, Cooperation, 1964
 The beautiful city of Plato and the ideal empire in ancient Iran (original title in ), in Persian language, 1973
 Al-Biruni and India (original title in ), in Persian language, 1973
 A Literary history of Persia, From Firdowsi to Sadi (original title in ), in Persian language, Translation, 1982
 Educational philosophy of Iqbal Lahori (original title in ), in Persian language, Introduction, 1983
 Ancient Greece (original title in ), in Persian language, Translation, 1986
 Zoroaster, Politician or Witch-doctor? (original title in ), in Persian language, Introduction, 1986
 Parrot Letter (original title in ), in Persian language, Correction, 1993
 Rai and Brahman: Excerpts from Kalīla wa-Dimna (original title in ), in Persian language, Introduction, 1995
 Ferdowsi's Shahnameh with Khamsa of Nizami (original title in ), in Persian language, Introduction, 2000
 Excerpts from Robert Frost (original title in ), in Persian language & English language, Translation, 2001
 Religious Research (original title in ), in Persian language, 2002
 Encyclopedia of Iranian women: water – blood money (original title in ), in Persian language, Cooperation, 2004
 Encyclopedia of Iranian women: Rabia Ghazdari – Youtik (original title in ), in Persian language, Cooperation, 2004
 Islam: Historical and Cultural Research (original title in ), in Persian language, Cooperation, 2004
 Hindi syntax and Arabic syntax (original title in ), in Persian language, 2005
 Excerpts from Yoga Vasistha (original title in ), in Persian language & English language, Translation, 2006
 Description of Lover's hair: Notes on The Divan of Hafez (original title in ), in Persian language, 2007
 Aspects of Hindu Muslim cultural relations (original title in ), in Persian language & English language, 2010
 Hafez (Life and Thought) (original title in ), in Persian language, Cooperation, 2013
 Great frontier letter: Tame minds (original title in ), in Persian language, Correction, 2013
 Bengal in Persian Sugar: Discourses on Cultural Relations between Iran and India (original title in ), in Persian language, 2013
 World's famous articles: a collection of essays and speeches (original title in ), in Persian language, 2017
 A letter to my child (original title in ), in Persian language, Introduction, 2017

Articles
 Mentioning a few points from the Great history of Jafari about the date of death of Nasir Khusraw, Ferdowsi and Khayyam (original title in ), in Persian language, 1962
 Scientific works on Islamic culture outside the Islamic world (original title in ), in Persian language, 1970
 Professor Tarachand, an Islamologist who loves Iran, researches his thoughts and works (original title in ), in Persian language, 1973
 Mysticism of Sage of Herat (original title in ), in Persian language, 1979
 The color of the clothes of class people in Indian and Iranian society (original title in ), in Persian language, 1981
 A few more points about verses from Shahnameh (original title in ), in Persian language, 1983
 The principle of acquisition and adaptation in quoting scientific concepts (original title in ), in Persian language, 1983
 New research on Sanai (original title in ), in Persian language, 1984
 Hafez and Khusrow (original title in ), in Persian language, 1985
 Familiarity of Muslims with Aristotelian logic (original title in ), in Persian language, 1988
 Roundtable: Dialogue of religions and understanding of cultural fields (original title in ), in Persian language, 1992
 The Realm of the Persian Language: An Ancient Version of Ferdowsi's Shahnameh Belonging to the Center for the Great Islamic Encyclopedia (original title in ), in Persian language, 1993
 Islamic culture and civilization (original title in ), in Persian language, 1994
 Interregnum period in the history of Islamic philosophy (original title in ), in Persian language, 1994
 Dr. Yazdgerdi, As I knew it (original title in ), in Persian language, 1994
 The story of the meeting and correspondence of Bu Ali and Bu Saeed (original title in ), in Persian language, 1996
 Superior and higher than the Brahmans (from the collection of "Fruit-Gathering") (original title in ), in Persian language, 1997
 Islam; Unity and dialogue of religions (original title in ), in Persian language, 1998
 Cultural exchange and invasion (original title in ), in Persian language, 1998
 On the corner of the roof (original title in ), in Persian language, His poems, 1998
 I was her hunting (original title in ), in Persian language, His poems, 1998
 Two poems by Dr. Fathollah Mojtabaei (original title in ), in Persian language, His poems, 1998
 In search of another horizon (original title in ), in Persian language, 2001
 Roundtable: Mysticism and Globalization (original title in ), in Persian language, 2001
 Suhrawardi and the culture of ancient Iran (original title in ), in Persian language, 2001
 Suhrawardi and the ancient Iran (original title in ), in Persian language, 2002
 Blind men and an elephant why was it dark in the house? (original title in ), in Persian language, 2002
 Iranology and Manuscripts (original title in ), in Persian language, 2002
 Indian religions (original title in ), in Persian language, 2003
 Elements of Tolerance in Indian Rituals (original title in ), in Persian language, 2004
 Iranian context of the Judeo-Christian concept of "MYSTERION" (original title in ), in Persian language, 2004
 Descent and thought of Tagore (original title in ), in Persian language, 2005
 Tagore and his poems: Ten lyric poems from the book Gardener of Love (original title in ), in Persian language, 2005
 Mani and Shapur, a historical experience of eclectic pluralism (original title in ), in Persian language, 2006
 India and Iranian identity (original title in ), in Persian language, 2006
 Hafez in Goethe's Faust (original title in ), in Persian language, 2008
 Religious policy of Islamic governments in the Indian subcontinent (from the beginning to the establishment of the Babrian state) (original title in ), in Persian language, 2008
 A Look at the History of Shaivism in Hinduism: Its Origins, Evolution and Schools (original title in ), in Persian language, 2008
 Azari Tusi (original title in ), in Persian language, 2009
 Dialogue: Aspects of Religious Historiography (original title in ), in Persian language, 2009
 The letters (original title in ), in Persian language, 2010
 The suffix "-tar" in Astar and Kabutar (original title in ), in Persian language, 2010
 A few points about Marzbannameh: the author and its main language (original title in ), in Persian language, 2011
 Asadi son and Asadi father: Ali ibn Ahmad and Ahmad ibn Mansour (original title in ), in Persian language, 2011
 Corner or treasure? (original title in ), in Persian language, 2011
 Most translations today are copyright infringement (original title in ), in Persian language, 2012
 Iran and India, a millennial bond (original title in ), in Persian language, 2013
 A few more points about corner or treasure (original title in ), in Persian language, 2013
 Tagore and New Bhakti Mysticism (original title in ), in Persian language, 2013
 Memoirs of the poet Khanlari, publisher of Sokhan magazine (original title in ), in Persian language, 2013
 Iqbal Lahori, a former religious intellectual (original title in ), in Persian language, 2014
 My acquaintance with Dr. Khanlari (original title in ), in Persian language, 2014
 Rajatarangini and the Background of Historiography in India (original title in ), in Persian language & English language, 2015
 Another look at the death date of Nasir Khusraw (original title in ), in Persian language, 2015
 Founder of correct and accurate publishing in Iran (original title in ), in Persian language, 2016
 What is the secret of Hafez's permanence? (original title in ), in Persian language, 2016
 A Greek word in Vendidad: from Eskhar and Eskar to Askar and Lashkar (original title in ), in Persian language, 2016
 Thanks to Mr. Samii (original title in ), in Persian language, 2016
 Praised man in memory of Dr. Manouchehr Sotoudeh (original title in ), in Persian language, 2016
 Mettle and education from the point of view of Saadi and Confucius (original title in ), in Persian language, 2016
 A brief look at the cultural relations between Iran and Greece during the Achaemenid period (original title in ), in Persian language, 2016
 Indo-Buddhist stories in Persian literature (original title in ), in Persian language, 2016
 Praised peoples by Daqiqi and another look at the date of his death (original title in ), in Persian language, 2018
 Maimonides and the method of confronting the simile verses of the Old Testament (original title in ), in Persian language, 2018
 Another look at a few verses of Hafez's sonnets (original title in ), in Persian language, 2018
 Eastern and Iranian view of India (original title in ), in Persian language, 2020

Honours
Dr. Fathollah Mojtabaei has received awards in various fields. Including:

 Celebrating his scientific and cultural services in Society for the National Heritage of Iran, 2000
 Iranian Science and Culture Hall of Fame as Ever-lasting Names / People in the field of religious history, 2002
 First Order of Culture and Art, 2003
 Iran's Book of the Year Awards for the book "Hindi syntax and Arabic syntax, ", 2006
 Farabi International Award as "Veteran of Iranian Humanities", 2008
 First Order of Persian Politeness, 2011
 Founder of Comparative Studies in Religions and Mysticism in Iran, 2018 and 2019

Dr. Fathollah Mojtabaei Award

Dr. Fathollah Mojtabaei Award is an award given to the best doctoral dissertation in the fields of Persian language and literature, religions and mysticism. The first ceremony of the award was held in December 2011 and nine of them have been held so far in Iran.

Documentary film
A documentary film about the life and scientific and cultural works of Dr. Fathollah Mojtabaei has been produced under the name of "How good it was that you were born (original title in )", which has been broadcast in July 2019 via IRIB TV4 channel.

See also
 Alireza Feyz
 Mahdi Ahouie
 Mehrdad Avesta
 Mohammad Taqi Danesh Pajouh
 Ali Osat Hashemi
 Ali Akbar Sadeghi

References

External links
 Fatholah Mojtabaei on civilica
 The sixth Award granting ceremony of Dr. Fathollah Mojtabaei
 Fear of the weakening of Farsi
 Iran to unveil encyclopedic book on country’s history
 Intl. Conference of Iran’s Languages and Dialects due
 India keen on enhanced cultural ties with Iran
 ‘Indology in Iran’ seminar held in Tehran
 The expediency of the kingdom and the idealistic-Shahi
 Documentary movie: Biography of Dr. Fathollah Mojtabaei
 Picture report of the "Ninth Award of Dr. Fathollah Mojtabaei"
 Picture report: "The final judging session of the ninth Dr. Mojtabaei Award"
 Picture report: Dr. Mojtabaei birthday party
 Documentary film: Dr. Mojtabaei biography

1927 births
Living people
Iranian Science and Culture Hall of Fame recipients in History
Members of the Academy of Persian Language and Literature
People from Tehran
Farabi International Award recipients
Harvard University alumni
Recipients of the Order of Persian Politeness
Recipients of the Order of Culture and Art
Iranian translators
Iran's Book of the Year Awards recipients
Faculty of Letters and Humanities of the University of Tehran alumni